The bookend is an object tall, sturdy, and heavy enough, when placed at either end of a row of upright books, to support or buttress them.   Heavy bookends—made of wood, bronze, marble, and even large geodes—have been used in libraries, stores and homes for centuries; the simple sheetmetal bookend (originally patented in 1877 by William Stebbins Barnard) uses the weight of the books standing on its foot to clamp the bookend's tall brace against the last book's back; in libraries, simple metal brackets are often used to support the end of a row of books. Elaborate and decorative bookends are common as elements in home decor.

The word "bookend" is also used metaphorically to refer to any pair of items which frame and define a significant or noteworthy event or place. For example, regarding the practice in the United States whereby Memorial Day and Labor Day demarcate the traditional beginning and end of summer, those two holidays could be referred to as bookends. Bookends are usually made of metal and plastic.

See also 
 Bookend terrace, a bookend effect in the design of terraced houses.

References

External links

 Bookend sizes
 The History of Bookends

Book terminology